"1996" is a song by Liverpudlian indie band, The Wombats. It was the sixth and final single released from their second album This Modern Glitch. The title of this album is also taken from a line in '1996'.

Track listings

References

Songs written by Matthew Murphy
Songs written by Tord Øverland Knudsen
Songs written by Dan Haggis
2011 singles
2011 songs
The Wombats songs
14th Floor Records singles